Martín Sánchez may refer to:

 Martín Sánchez (boxer) (1979–2005), Mexican featherweight boxer
 Martín Sánchez (footballer) (born 2000), Paraguayan footballer